Michael Morley may refer to: 
 Michael Morley (actor) (born 1994), Australia 
 Michael Morley (musician), New Zealand musician, member of The Dead C 
 Michael D. Morley (1930–2020), American mathematician and model theorist
 Mike Morley (born 1946), American golfer
 Michael Morley (athlete), Australian Paralympic athlete
 Michael Morley (politician), member of the Utah House of Representatives
 Michael Morley (banker) (born 1957), British banker
 The Michelson–Morley experiment, a groundbreaking experiment in physics
 Michael Morley, an alternate personality of the vampire Caleb Morley, on Port Charles